Some metal-organic frameworks (MOF) display large structural changes as a response to external stimuli, and such modifications of their structure can, in turn, lead to drastic changes in their physical and chemical properties. Such stimuli-responsive MOFs are generally referred to as a flexible metal-organic frameworks. They can also be called dynamic metal-organic framework, stimuli-responsive MOFs, multi-functional MOFs, or soft porous crystals. Formally, a metal-organic framework is a coordination network with organic ligands containing potential voids. A coordination network is a coordination compound extending, through repeating coordination entities, in one dimension, but with cross-links between two or more individual chains, loops, or spiro-links, or a coordination compound extending through repeating coordination entities in two or three dimensions. A coordination polymer is a coordination compound with repeating coordination entities extending in one, two, or three dimensions.

Generally, this kind of material has a well-defined structure, but sometimes some external stimuli can affect its structure, resulting in a different structure without breaking the overall network. A variety of external stimuli like heat, light, solvent, an electric field, magnetic field, etc. can act upon a metal-organic framework, can act to change its internal structure, and can facilitate the transformation process. This structural transformation generally occurs by bond breaking/making, change of coordination number of the metal ion, change of coordination mode of ligand, ligand length squeezing, solvent exchange, solvent removal, etc.

One often discussed example of flexible metal-organic framework is the family of MIL-53 materials, featuring one-dimensional diamond-shaped pores that can expand or contract upon stimulation, such as adsorption of guest molecules (solvent, water, gases, etc.), changes in temperature, and mechanical pressure.

References

See also 

Coordination chemistry
Coordination polymers
Metal–inorganic framework
Organometallic chemistry
Zeolitic imidazolate frameworks
Solid sorbents for carbon capture